The Environmentally Friendly Linkage System, abbreviated to EFLS and commonly called the Kai Tak Monorail, was a government-proposed monorail system to be located in the Kai Tak Development area of Hong Kong with 12 stations. The system was expected to be completed in 2023, at a cost of HK$12 billion, and to take up 15 percent of public transport in the Kowloon East Development. 

In the 2020 policy address, chief executive Carrie Lam implicitly shelved the monorail plan, citing a feasibility study that suggested the EFLS should comprise a multi-modal transport system involving buses and pedestrian routes, rather than a railway, with the details of this newer proposal still unclear. Footbridges with travellators were proposed subsequently as an alternative.

History 
Throughout the 1990s, a number of master plans were drawn up to prepare for the eventual reuse of the Kai Tak airport land. The South East Kowloon Development Statement (1993) and the Feasibility Study for South East Kowloon Development (1998) both proposed that the site be served by two conventional Mass Transit Railway lines running underground. A 2001 study removed the line serving the former runway area, replacing it with a proposed "trolley bus or light rai systeml". In light of the Protection of the Harbour Ordinance and overwhelming public opinion against further reclamation of Victoria Harbour, the plan for Kai Tak was further cut back. But this basic premise of a light rail system in the area would eventually turn into the plan for a monorail.

In 2007, the Kai Tak Outline Zoning Plans with railway connection system was approved by the Executive Council.

The EFLS project was headed by the Development Bureau with public consultation carried out by the Civil Engineering and Development Department. 

The Civil Engineering and Development Department appointed consultants to review the flexibility of the EFLS.

Under the 2011-2012 Policy Address, Kowloon East would become the city's second central business district.

However, in the 2020 policy address, chief executive Carrie Lam approvingly cited a feasibility study suggesting that the EFLS should instead comprise a multi-modal system of buses, minibuses, travellators, and cycling and pedestrian infrastructure, rather than a railway system, which implied that the monorail plan had been shelved.

Technology debate
Hong Kong Tramways Limited proposed building a modern tramway, instead of a monorail, on the grounds of lower construction cost, more affordable fares, lower operating cost, improved flexibility for future extensions, less visual impact, no noise pollution, and socio-economic benefits. Norman Y. S. Heung, project manager from the Civil Engineering and Development Department, responded that it would not be acceptable for a tramway to share ground space with cars. Emmanuel Vivant, general manager of Hong Kong Tramways, responded that "in a city that rightly prides itself on putting priority on public transport, and where only 10 per cent of trips are done by private car, it should not be impossible to allocate space to tram lanes that can each carry eight times as many people as a road lane" and that "promoting usage of emission-free modern tramways rather than polluting private cars, would be a perfectly sensible policy decision. Where necessary, the modern tramway can simply share space with other road users".

The need for heavy construction of any kind was challenged by the Hong Kong Cycling Alliance, on the basis that the 13-kilometre cycling network already planned for the area provided viable and more flexible connectivity, at much lower environmental impact.

The South China Morning Post claimed that a "green bus network" would cost less than HK$400 million, and could still make a profit.

Finances 
The cost of construction at 2010 prices was HK$12 billion, with patronage expected to hit 200,000 by 2031, according to the government. In 2012 officials estimated that building a monorail would have yielded a return of one per cent, versus four per cent for a conventional railway. The Post reported that the system would break even only if the government bore the capital and asset replacement costs.

Stations 

The MTR walk‐in catchment coverage has usually a 500-metre radius or less than 8-minute walking time. After considering estimated passenger and fire safety issues, the Civil Engineering and Development Department took the MTR walk-in catchment coverage as an indicator for the selection of the EFLS station site.

Rolling stock
As of 2015, the government planned to use two-car monorail trains with capacities of about 250 passengers. The stations would have been designed to allow for future expansion to three-car trains.

References

External links 

 

Proposed public transport in Hong Kong
Proposed monorails
Kai Tak Development